Haines City is a city in Polk County, Florida, United States. Its population was 13,174 at the 2000 census and 20,535 at the 2010 census. It is the third most populous city in Polk County. It is part of the Lakeland–Winter Haven Metropolitan Statistical Area, which, in turn, is considered part of the Tampa Bay Area.

History

Haines City was platted in 1885, shortly after the South Florida Railroad reached the area. The city was first known as Clay Cut, but there was no railroad station.  It is said that the inhabitants persuaded the railroad company to build a station by agreeing to rename their city Haines City, to honor a senior railroad official, former Confederate States Army Colonel Henry Haines.

The City of Haines City was originally incorporated under the General Statutes of Florida as the Town of Haines City on February 23, 1914. The first state legislative act affecting the City was enacted on May 20, 1919, and, by Chapter 8272, it was reincorporated under a Mayor-Council form of government. The present charter was adopted as Chapter 12790 on July 1, 1927, changing the form of government to "Commission-Manager Plan," as amended. The City operates under a commission-manager form of government and provides the following services as authorized by its charter: Public safety (Police and Fire), Streets and Highways, Culture-Recreation, Public Improvements, Sanitation, Planning and Zoning and General and Administrative Services.

The early settlers planted citrus groves, and citrus growing and processing became the main industry of the city.

From 1974 to 1986, Circus World, a theme park created by the Ringling Brothers and Barnum & Bailey Circus, was open just north of Haines City. After Circus World shut down, Boardwalk and Baseball opened on the same site.  It featured carnival games and theme park styled rides like the Grand Rapids Flume.  It closed in 1990, and the site has been redeveloped as a residential and shopping complex named Posner Park.

In recent years Haines City has seen explosive growth, largely because of its easy access to Orlando and Walt Disney World Resort.  New residential areas have been developed on the edges of the city.  On high ground in the north of the city, Southern Dunes, a golf and country club with both vacation homes and residential homes, was developed between 1995 and 2005.

In 2004, Haines City experienced three hurricanes. Hurricane Charley passed through the city in August. Hurricane Frances came right on the heels of Charley but mostly just dumped a lot of rain. Hurricane Jeanne soon followed packing a punch not quite as strong as Charley but longer lasting. The city has since recovered.

Four years after Charley, Haines City got struck again this time by a weaker storm named Tropical Storm Fay. This storm caused little damage, but schools closed on the second day of the school year (Tuesday, August 19) due to it; the original plan had been to close schools Tuesday and Wednesday, but the lack of danger it showed on Tuesday caused the change in agenda.

Park renovations

A new park on Lake Eva, replacing a previous park on the site, was completed in 2009. The city has also built a new park, called "8-Acre Park", and auditorium in the Oakland area, on the northern side of the city.

Brush fire

Haines City was the site of a  brush fire on March 25, 2009. It was a scare to the residents of dozens of houses in a housing complex named Randa Ridge.

Legoland

Haines City is responding to the arrival of Legoland Florida in Winter Haven. Legoland's expected tourist influx is leading Haines City to search for ways to advertise and bring more people to the historic downtown area, specifically motorists coming down U.S. 27 from Interstate 4.

City officials

Haines City operates on a council-manager system, with five City Commissioners elected at large who appoint a City Manager and other officials in the city administration.

Geography and climate

Haines City is located within the Central Florida Highlands area of the Atlantic coastal plain, part of the Lake Wales Ridge, a sandy terrain consisting of a low ridge of gently rolling hills rising from the coastal flatlands.

Haines City is located in the humid subtropical zone as designated by (Köppen climate classification: Cfa). The porous white sands and open terrain create the often hot and dry climate that parts of interior Florida near the Lakes Wales sand ridge is known for.

Demographics

As of the census of 2000, there were 13,174 people, 4,749 households, and 3,409 families residing in the city. The racial makeup of the city was 54.87% White, 31.86% African American, 0.52% Native American, 0.39% Asian, 0.04% Pacific Islander, 10.42% from other races, and 1.90% from two or more races. Hispanic or Latino of any race were 23.33% of the population.

There were 4,749 households, out of which 30.7% had children under the age of 18 living with them, 49.3% were married couples living together, 17.4% had a female householder with no husband present, and 28.2% were non-families. 23.2% of all households were made up of individuals, and 12.3% had someone living alone who was 65 years of age or older.  The average household size was 2.73 and the average family size was 3.18.

In the city, the population was spread out, with 27.2% under the age of 18, 10.3% from 18 to 24, 25.0% from 25 to 44, 18.9% from 45 to 64, and 18.6% who were 65 years of age or older.  The median age was 35 years. For every 100 females, there were 96.2 males.  For every 100 females age 18 and over, there were 91.1 males.

The median income for a household in the city was $27,636, and the median income for a family was $30,678. Males had a median income of $21,806 versus $19,279 for females. The per capita income for the city was $13,818.  About 14.7% of families and 18.6% of the population were below the poverty line, including 24.3% of those under age 18 and 11.2% of those age 65 or over.

In 2010, Haines City had a population of 20,535.  The racial and ethnic makeup of the population was 31.8% non-Hispanic white, 27.5% black or African American, 0.5% Native American, 0.4% Asian Indian, 1.0% other Asian, 0.2% non-Hispanic reporting some other race, 2.7% reporting two or more races and 38.9% Hispanic or Latino.  23.5% of the population was Mexican while 9.5% of the population was Puerto Rican.

Transportation 

The major highways in the Haines City area are:
  (Interstate 4) –  Six miles north of town on US 27 lies Interstate 4, the main interstate highway in central Florida.  It leads westward to Lakeland and Tampa, and eastward toward Orlando.
   – US 17/92 enters the city from Lake Alfred in the west, bisecting the downtown as Hinson Avenue until turning north on 17th Street and exiting towards Davenport.
  – The main north–south highway in the area, US 27 leads northward to I-4 and further to Clermont. It leads southward to Lake Wales, Sebring and eventually Miami.
  – Called 10th Street in Haines City, this old Scenic Highway leads through hills in eastern Polk County and providing a scenic route southward to Lake Hamilton, Dundee, and Lake Wales, and on to Sebring.
  – This road, also a scenic drive, connects SR 17 and US 27 in southern Haines City, and continues westward from there as Lucerne Park Road on its way to Winter Haven.

The streets are laid out in a rough grid plan, with streets running north–south and numbered from 1st Street to 30th Street, and named avenues running west–east.

Haines City is served by an hourly bus service to Lake Alfred and Winter Haven by Winter Haven Area Transit and, from December 16, 2012, by hourly Lynx bus services to Poinciana and Four Corners.

Railroads have always been a part of Haines City's history, and freight and passenger trains still run through the city, although the railroad station has been closed for many years.

Library

The Haines City Public Library is a member of the Polk County Library Cooperative. It is located at 111 N 6th Street Haines City, FL 33844.

Notable schools

Haines City has many schools including Landmark Baptist College, Landmark Christian School, Daniel Jenkins Academy of Technology Middle School, Haines City High School, Ridge Community High School, Shelley S. Boone Middle School and Bethune Academy Eastside Elementary and Alta Vista Elementary.

Notable people

 Wayne Gandy (born 1971), former football player for the Atlanta Falcons
 Mary Hatcher (1929–2018), singer and actress
 Derwin James (born 1996), American football player for Los Angeles Chargers
 Tommy Land (born 1955), Arkansas Commissioner of State Lands (elect)
 Joseph Mitchell, city manager 1974–1977; formerly the city manager of Newburgh, New York
 Jah Reid (born 1988), football player for the Baltimore Ravens
 James Stewart Jr. (born 1985), American professional motocross racer
 Malcolm Stewart (born 1992), American professional Supercross racer
 Sevyn Streeter (born 1986), R&B singer and songwriter

References

External links

City of Haines City Official Site
Florida Backroads Travel

 
1885 establishments in Florida
Cities in Polk County, Florida
Populated places established in 1885
Cities in Florida